Lisa Teige (born 19 January 1998) is a Norwegian actress and dancer. She played Eva in the TV series Skam (2015–2017). In 2018, she played Amalie in the Norwegian film Battle.

Filmography

Movies

Television

References

External links 
 

1998 births
21st-century Norwegian actresses
Actors from Bergen
Living people
Norwegian television actresses
Norwegian film actresses